The following lists events that happened during 2014 in the Republic of South Sudan.

Incumbents 
 President: Salva Kiir Mayardit
 Vice President: James Wani Igga

Events

January
 January 3 - The United States evacuates additional diplomatic personnel at its embassy in Juba due to the deteriorating security situation.

April
 April 17 - Dozens of civilians sheltering in a UN base in Bor are killed in an attack by armed men.
 April 21 - The UN condemns the "Targeted Killings" and wounding of hundreds of civilians based on their ethnic origins in the town of Bentiu after South Sudanese rebels seized the oil hub last week.

November
 November 4 - The United States circulates a draft resolution proposing a sanctions regime for conflict-torn South Sudan.

December
 December 8 - The United Nations seeks $16.4 billion to fund humanitarian assistance programs in 2015 with Syria, Iraq, Sudan and South Sudan the areas of greatest need.

References

 
South Sudan
Years of the 21st century in South Sudan
2010s in South Sudan
South Sudan